100 Proof: The Hangover is the third studio album by East Coast hip hop producer Statik Selektah. The album was released on February 2, 2010. The album features guest appearances from Royce da 5'9", Termanology, Freeway, Lil' Fame of M.O.P., Bun B, Wale, Styles P, Evidence of Dilated Peoples, Saigon, and more. The first single was "The Thrill Is Gone" featuring Styles P and Talib Kweli.

Track listing
All songs produced by Statik Selektah

Charts

References

2010 albums
Statik Selektah albums
Albums produced by Statik Selektah